1026 Ingrid, provisional designation , is a stony Florian asteroid and long-lost minor planet (1923–1986) from the inner regions of the asteroid belt, approximately 7 kilometers in diameter. It was discovered by Karl Reinmuth at Heidelberg in 1923, and later named after Ingrid, niece and godchild of astronomer Albrecht Kahrstedt.

Discovery and recovery 

Ingrid was discovered on 13 August 1923, by German astronomer Karl Reinmuth at the Heidelberg-Königstuhl State Observatory in southwest Germany. The asteroid was observed for only a few days during August 1923, before it became a lost minor planet for nearly 63 years until its recovery by Japanese astronomer Syuichi Nakano in 1986.

With the recovery of Ingrid in 1986, and the almost simultaneously recovered asteroid 1179 Mally, the list of long-lost numbered asteroids was reduced to four. The last remaining lost asteroid, 69230 Hermes, was recovered in 2003.

Orbit and classification 

Ingrid is a member of the Flora family, a giant asteroid family and the largest family of stony asteroids. It orbits the Sun in the inner main-belt at a distance of 1.8–2.7 AU once every 3 years and 5 months (1,237 days). Its orbit has an eccentricity of 0.18 and an inclination of 5° with respect to the ecliptic. The body's observation arc begins at Heidelberg, one night after its official discovery observation in 1923.

Physical characteristics 

Ingrid is an assumed S-type asteroid, in-line with the Flora family's spectral type.

Rotation period 

A rotational lightcurve of Ingrid was obtained from photometric observations by a group of Hungarian astronomers. The 2005-published lightcurve analysis gave a rotation period of 5 hours with a brightness variation of 0.5 magnitude.

Diameter and albedo 

According to the surveys carried out by the Japanese Akari satellite and the NEOWISE mission of NASA's Wide-field Infrared Survey Explorer, Ingrid measures between 5.73 and 7.67 kilometers in diameter and its surface has an albedo between 0.1441 and 0.43.

The Collaborative Asteroid Lightcurve Link assumes an albedo of 0.24 – derived from 8 Flora, the largest member and namesake of the Flora family – and calculates a diameter of 8.19 kilometers based an absolute magnitude of 12.6.

Naming 

This minor planet was named after Ingrid, niece and godchild of Albrecht Kahrstedt (1897–1971), a German astronomer at ARI and director of the institute's Potsdam division, who requested the naming of this asteroid and 984 Gretia (mother of Ingrid) in a personal letter to the discoverer in February 1926.

The official naming citation was mentioned in The Names of the Minor Planets by Paul Herget in 1955. Lutz Schmadel quoted an excerpt of Kahrstedt's letter in his Dictionary of Minor Planet Names (LDS).

References

External links 
 Asteroid Lightcurve Database (LCDB), query form (info )
 Dictionary of Minor Planet Names, Google books
 Asteroids and comets rotation curves, CdR – Observatoire de Genève, Raoul Behrend
 Discovery Circumstances: Numbered Minor Planets (1)-(5000) – Minor Planet Center
 
 

001026
Discoveries by Karl Wilhelm Reinmuth
Named minor planets
19230813